Marianne Le Verge (born 12 June 1979, Brest, France) is a former French swimmer who competed in the 1996 Summer Olympics.

References

External lists

1979 births
Living people
French female freestyle swimmers
Olympic swimmers of France
Swimmers at the 1996 Summer Olympics